Jon Levin (born March 18, 1966) is an American musician and the current guitarist for heavy metal band Dokken.

Biography

Early years
Jon Levin was involved with music very early on in life. He began playing piano at age four, trumpet by age seven, and guitar at age nine. Instead of having formal lessons, Levin played along to his favorite musicians including Randy Rhoads, Eric Clapton and later George Lynch from Dokken, whose place Levin would eventually take. He played in a club band called Devias at age 19 in the Long Island, New York area, and then auditioned for and joined German band Warlock at age 22. When the grunge scene took over in the early 1990s, Levin took a break from being a musician because he wasn't interested in that type of music. Levin relocated to the West Coast and became an entertainment lawyer. In his capacity as an entertainment lawyer, Jon has served as legal counsel, working with Jim Paidas, of Paidas Management, on a myriad of licensing programs; some of which include Orange County Choppers, Dog the Bounty Hunter, American Hot Rod, and Rockstalgia.

Dokken
In 1998, Levin was asked by Jeff Pilson, Dokken's bassist, to play some solos on a demo. He anticipated playing on a solo album for Pilson, but when he arrived at the studio, all of Dokken was present. Levin played on a Dokken track called "Dancin' (The Irish Song)" which originally was to be included on the Erase the Slate album but instead was later included on the Long Way Home import. However, Levin did not join the group until late 2003.

Discography

With Doro
 Force Majeure (1989)

With Dokken
 Hell to Pay (2004)
 Lightning Strikes Again (2008)
Broken Bones (2012)

References 

1966 births
20th-century American guitarists
American heavy metal guitarists
Dokken members
Jewish American musicians
Jewish heavy metal musicians
Living people
People from Woodmere, New York
21st-century American Jews
Warlock (band)